Minuscule 574 (in the Gregory-Aland numbering), ε 1295 (in the Soden numbering), is a Greek minuscule manuscript of the New Testament, on parchment. Palaeographically it has been assigned to the 13th century.
The manuscript is lacunose.

Description 

The codex contains the text of the four Gospels on 215 parchment leaves (size ) with lacunae (John 10:1-11:38; 11:39-57; 12:25-13:1; 15:26-16:15). The writing is in one column per page, 27 lines per page.

It contains tables of the  before each Gospel and portraits of the four Evangelists.

Text 

The Greek text of the codex is a representative of the Byzantine text-type. Hermann von Soden classified it to the textual family Kx. Aland placed it in Category V.
According to the Claremont Profile Method it represents Kx in Luke 10 (cluster with codex 281), in Luke 20 it creates cluster with the code 585, in Luke 1 it has mixed text.

History 

The manuscript came from Karahissar. Titoff, Russian envoy in Turkey, purchased this manuscript and presented it to the Imperial Library in Petersburg.

The manuscripts was examined, described, and collated by Eduard de Muralt (along with the codices 565-566, 568-572, 575, and 1567). The manuscript was also examined by Kurt Treu.

Currently the manuscript is housed at the National Library of Russia (Gr. 105) in Saint Petersburg.

See also 

 List of New Testament minuscules
 Biblical manuscript
 Textual criticism

Notes

References

Further reading 

 Eduard de Muralt, Catalogue des manuscrits grecs de la Bibliothèque Impériale publique (Petersburg 1864).
 Eduard de Muralt, Novum Testamentum Graece (Hamburg, 1848)
 Kurt Treu, Die griechischen Handschriften des Neuen Testaments in der UdSSR; eine systematische Auswertung des Texthandschriften in Leningrad, Moskau, Kiev, Odessa, Tbiblisi und Erevan, Texte und Untersuchungen 91 (Berlin, 1966), pp. 67–70.
 E. C. Colwell & H. R. Willoughly, The Four Gospels of Karahissar (2 vols., Chicago, 1936)

Greek New Testament minuscules
13th-century biblical manuscripts
National Library of Russia collection